The Battle of Lerin or Battle of Florina or Chegan offensive was an offensive operation of the Bulgarian army during the First World War between 17–28 August 1916 in which they conquered the city of Florina (in present-day Greece but in Bulgaria known as Lerin), but failed to take Chegan.

Background
In August 1916 Romania chose to join the war effort on the side of the Entente. The Allies planned a large offensive in the Macedonian front for the middle of August in order to support Romania's entry in the war and pin down as many Bulgarian forces as possible. The Bulgarian high command suspected an impending offensive and the fighting around Doiran that erupted on 9 August only confirmed these suspicions. On their part the Bulgarians had urged for an offensive in Macedonia since the beginning of the year and now planned a strike with the First Army and Second Army on both Allied flanks.

The Struma operation on the eastern flank by the Bulgarian Second Army under general Todorov was a huge success, mainly because the Greek government ordered their troops not to resist.

Chegan operation 
The advance on the right flank was to be undertaken by the Bulgarian First Army which had the following order of battle in July 1916:

The Germans finally agreed that an offensive was needed and on 12 August general Boyadzhiev received his orders from the headquarters of Army Group "Mackensen". The right wing of the army, consisting of the reinforced 8th infantry division (four and half infantry brigades,) was to advance and take Lerin while parts of the 3rd division towards the Chegan mountain range and the village of the same name (today known as Agios Athanasios, to the north-west of Lake Vegoritida, in the Greek regional unit of Pella). General Boyadzhiev agreed to attack but had concerns regarding the final results of the offensive because his army was scattered on a 140 km front and lacked enough mountain and heavy artillery.
Facing the Bulgarians were the six infantry and one cavalry divisions of the three Serbian armies.

The offensive began on 17 August 1916 with the Bulgarians taking Lerin and Banitsa. The advance however soon ran into difficulty and slowed considerably due to the increased Serbian resistance. The fighting was especially heavy on the bare rocky slopes of the Chegan Mountain and the Voras Mountains. The Serbians were constantly reinforced with new artillery and fresh troops thanks to railway that reached the battlefield while the Bulgarians soon began depleting their ammunition stocks. This and the slow advance forced the Bulgarian high command to call off all attacks on 27 August and order the forces to dig in on the occupied positions between Lake Vegoritida, Lake Petron and along the ridges of the Voras Mountains . For the next several days the Bulgarian positions were subjected to heavy artillery fire and few Serbian attacks that were repulsed.

Consequences 

The Chegan Offensive also known as the Lerin Offensive had failed. It failed to influence Romania which entered the war on the side of the Allies, but also failed to achieve its final military objective to take the Chegan village and the pass north of Lake Ostrovo.

French General Maurice Sarrail now prepared a counterattack against the First Bulgarian Army that would eventually develop in the Monastir Offensive. Lerin/Florina was retaken by the French on 23 September 1916.

Sources 

 These units were termed "Army", they were in fact corps sized formations.

See also 
 First Army (Bulgaria)

Battles of the Balkans Theatre (World War I)
Battles of World War I involving Bulgaria
Battles of World War I involving Serbia
Serbia in World War I
Greece in World War I
Battles involving France
Battles in Macedonia (Greece)
1916 in Bulgaria
1916 in Serbia
Florina
Macedonian front
August 1916 events